The Associazione Nazionale della Pastorizia, or roughly "national association of pastoralists", is the Italian national body responsible for the administration of sheep- and goat-breeding. It maintains the herd books for more than a hundred indigenous breeds of sheep and goats. It records breed numbers and submits them twice yearly to DAD-IS, and keeps records for all breeders of sheep and goats in the country.

Breeds

The association maintains genealogical herdbooks for seventeen principal breeds of sheep, of which eight – the Altamurana, Comisana, Delle Langhe, Leccese, Massese, Pinzirita, Sarda and Valle del Belice – are milk breeds, and nine – the Appenninica, Barbaresca, Bergamasca, Biellese, Fabrianese, Gentile di Puglia, Laticauda, Merinizzata Italiana and Sopravissana - are meat breeds. It also maintains genealogical herd books for the eight principal goat breeds, the Camosciata delle Alpi or Chamois Coloured Goat, the Garganica, Girgentana, Jonica, Maltese, Orobica, Rossa Mediterranea, Saanen and Sarda. A less stringent herd book is kept for forty-six indigenous sheep breeds and forty-three goat breeds of limited distribution.

Note

References

Agricultural organisations based in Italy